Mukim Lamunin is a mukim in Tutong District, Brunei. The population was 4,298 in 2016.

Geography 
The mukim is located in the east and centre of the Tutong District, bordering Mukim Kiudang to the north, the Limbang District in the Malaysian state of Sarawak to the east, Mukim Rambai to the south and south-west, Mukim Ukong to the west and Mukim Tanjong Maya to north-west.

The mukim is named after Kampong Lamunin, one of the villages it encompasses.

Demographics 
As of 2016 census, the population was 4,298 with  males and  females. The mukim had 770 households occupying 760 dwellings. The entire population lived in rural areas.

Villages 
As of 2016, the mukim comprised the following census villages:

Infrastructures 
The local primary schools include Kampong Menengah Primary School, Lamunin Primary School and Panchong Primary School. Meanwhile, another , namely Lamunin Religious School, has its own grounds.

The local mosques include:
 Kampong Layong Mosque — inaugurated on 20 July 1990; it can accommodate 300 worshippers.
 Kampong Menengah Mosque — inaugurated on 27 July 1990; it can accommodate 230 worshippers.

Lamunin Health Centre is the community health centre for the local residents as well as those in Mukim Rambai, Mukim Ukong, Mukim Kiudang and Mukim Tanjong Maya.

Other local facilities include Lamunin Post Office, Lamunin Police Station and Lamunin Fire Station.

Notes

References 

Lamunin
Tutong District